The International Ski Federation (FIS) Alpine Ski World Cup was the premier circuit for alpine skiing competition. The inaugural season launched in January 1967, and the  season marked the 56th consecutive year for the FIS World Cup.

This season began in October 2021 in Sölden, Austria, and concluded in mid-March 2022 at the finals in Courchevel/Méribel, France. It was interrupted for most of February by the Winter Olympics in Beijing, China; events were held at Xiaohaituo Alpine Skiing Field.

Alexis Pinturault and Petra Vlhová were the defending overall champions, but first-time overall winner Marco Odermatt won the 2022 men's championship with three races to go and Mikaela Shiffrin won the 2022 women's championship for her fourth overall title with two races to go.

For the first time in the history of the World Cup, either for men or for women, Beaver Creek is hosting four speed events four days in a row, with two downhills and two super giant slaloms. Ultimately, though, one of those races was cancelled by bad weather.

For the first time in almost four years (28 January 2018, Lenzerheide) Mikaela Shiffrin didn't finish her second run (SL in Kranjska Gora). With her 47th slalom victory on 11 January in Schladming, Shiffrin set a new all-time record for victories in any single discipline in the history of the World Cup, surpassing Ingemar Stenmark and his 46 wins in the giant slalom.

Austrian skier Johannes Strolz became the 300th different race winner in men's World Cup history by taking his first career win (SL) at Adelboden.

An oddity occurred when Lucas Braathen won the Slalom in Wengen after being in 29th place after the first run.

Dave Ryding, after winning the Slalom in Kitzbühel, became the first British skier ever to win a World Cup event and at 35 years old, the oldest first-time World Cup winner.

On 1 March 2022, following the 2022 Russian invasion of Ukraine, FIS decided to exclude athletes from Russia and Belarus from FIS competitions, with an immediate effect.

Map of world cup hosts 
All 31 locations hosting world cup events for men (19), for women (21) and shared (10) in this season.

 Women
 Men
 Shared

Men
The number of races in the World Cup history

after SL in Méribel (20 March 2022)

Calendar

Rankings

Overall

Downhill

Super-G

Giant slalom

Slalom

Parallel (PG)

Women
The number of races in the World Cup history

after GS in Méribel (20 March 2022)

Calendar

Rankings

Overall

Downhill

Super-G

Giant slalom

Slalom

Parallel (PG)

Alpine team event
World Cup history in real time

after PG in Méribel (18 March 2022)

Calendar

* reserve skiers

Nations Cup

Overall

Men

Women

Prize money

Top-5 men

Top-5 women

Podium table by nation 
Table showing the World Cup podium places (gold–1st place, silver–2nd place, bronze–3rd place) by the countries represented by the athletes.

Achievements 

First World Cup career victory 

Men
 Christian Hirschbühl (31), in his 8th season – Parallel Giant Slalom in Lech/Zürs
 Bryce Bennett (29), in his 9th season – Downhill in Val Gardena/Gröden
 Johannes Strolz (29), in his 8th season – Slalom in Adelboden
 Dave Ryding (35), in his 12th season – Slalom in Kitzbühel
 Cameron Alexander (24), in his 3rd season – Downhill in Kvitfjell
 Atle Lie McGrath (21), in his 4th season – Slalom in Flachau

Women 
 Andreja Slokar (24), in her 5th season – Parallel Giant Slalom in Lech/Zürs
   Priska Nufer (30), in her 10th season – Downhill in Crans Montana
 Romane Miradoli (27), in her 10th season – Super-G in Lenzerheide

First World Cup podium 

Men
 Christian Hirschbühl (31), in his 8th season – Parallel Giant Slalom in Lech/Zürs – 1st place
 Bryce Bennett (29), in his 9th season – Downhill in Val Gardena/Gröden – 1st place
 Johannes Strolz (29), in his 8th season – Slalom in Adelboden – 1st place
 Cameron Alexander (24), in his 3rd season – Downhill in Kvitfjell – 1st place
 Dominik Raschner (27), in his 7th season – Parallel Giant Slalom in Lech/Zürs – 2nd place
 Kristoffer Jakobsen (27), in his 6th season – Slalom in Val d'Isère – 2nd place
 Luca De Aliprandini (31), in his 11th season – Giant Slalom in Alta Badia – 2nd place
 Raphael Haaser (24), in his 3rd season – Super-G in Bormio – 2nd place
 James Crawford (24), in his 6th season – Super-G in Kvitfjell – 2nd place
 Broderick Thompson (27), in his 6th season – Super-G in Beaver Creek – 3rd place
 Blaise Giezendanner (30), in his 9th season – Downhill in Kitzbühel – 3rd place
 Daniel Hemetsberger (30), in his 5th season – Downhill in Kitzbühel – 3rd place

Women
 Andreja Slokar (24), in her 5th season – Parallel Giant Slalom in Lech/Zürs – 1st place
   Priska Nufer (30), in her 10th season – Downhill in Crans Montana – 1st place
 Romane Miradoli (27), in her 10th season – Super-G in Lenzerheide – 1st place
 Thea Louise Stjernesund (24), in her 4th season – Parallel Giant Slalom in Lech/Zürs – 2nd place
 Kristin Lysdahl (25), in her 6th season – Parallel Giant Slalom in Lech/Zürs – 3rd place
 Ariane Rädler (26), in her 4th season – Super-G in Zauchensee – 3rd place

Number of wins this season (in brackets are all-time wins) 

Men
 Aleksander Aamodt Kilde – 7 (13)
   Marco Odermatt – 7 (11)
 Henrik Kristoffersen – 5 (28)
 Vincent Kriechmayr – 3 (12)
 Dominik Paris – 2 (21) 
 Atle Lie McGrath – 2 (2)
   Beat Feuz – 1 (16) 
 Matthias Mayer – 1 (11)
 Clément Noël – 1 (9)
 Linus Straßer – 1 (3)
 Lucas Braathen – 1 (2)
 Sebastian Foss-Solevåg – 1 (2)
   Niels Hintermann – 1 (2)
 Cameron Alexander – 1 (1)
 Bryce Bennett – 1 (1)
 Christian Hirschbühl – 1 (1)
 Dave Ryding – 1 (1)
 Johannes Strolz – 1 (1)

Women
 Petra Vlhová – 6 (26)
 Sofia Goggia – 6 (17)
 Mikaela Shiffrin – 5 (74)
 Federica Brignone – 4 (20)
 Sara Hector – 3 (4)
   Lara Gut-Behrami – 2 (34)
 Tessa Worley – 2 (16)
 Andreja Slokar – 2 (2)
   Corinne Suter – 1 (4)
 Cornelia Hütter – 1 (3)
 Ester Ledecká – 1 (3)
 Katharina Liensberger – 1 (3)
 Elena Curtoni – 1 (2)
 Ragnhild Mowinckel – 1 (2)
 Romane Miradoli – 1 (1)
   Priska Nufer – 1 (1)

Retirements
The following athletes announced their retirements during or after the season:

Men

   Carlo Janka
 Kjetil Jansrud
 Alexander Köll
 Elias Kolega
 Alex Leever
   Nils Mani
 Manfred Mölgg
 Roberto Nani
 Nicolas Raffort
   Marco Reymond
 Olle Sundin

Women
   Carole Bissig
   Charlotte Chable
 Ida Dannewitz
 Patrizia Dorsch
 Maruša Ferk Saioni
 Magdalena Fjällström
   Luana Flütsch
 Verena Gasslitter
 Tiffany Gauthier
 Andrea Komšić
 Francesca Marsaglia
 Roberta Midali
 Erin Mielzynski
 Nuria Pau
 Kateřina Pauláthová
 Meike Pfister
 Stephanie Resch
 Kristina Riis-Johannessen
 Federica Sosio

See also
2021–22 FIS Alpine Ski Continental Cup
2021–22 FIS Alpine Ski Europa Cup
2021–22 FIS Alpine Ski Nor-Am Cup
2021–22 FIS Alpine Ski Far East Cup
2021–22 FIS Alpine Ski South American Cup
2021–22 FIS Alpine Ski Australia-New Zealand Cup

Notes

References 

 
FIS Alpine Ski World Cup
World Cup
World Cup